Dean Close School is a public school in Cheltenham, Gloucestershire, England. The school is divided into pre-prep, preparatory and senior schools located on separate but adjacent sites outside Cheltenham town centre, occupying the largest private land area in the town. The school is now co-educational, with both day and boarding pupils, who may be enrolled as young as 3 in the pre-preparatory school, and continue through to 18 at the senior school. Dean Close is a member of the Headmasters' and Headmistresses' Conference.

The Headmaster of the Senior School is Bradley Salisbury and the Headmaster of the Preparatory School is Paddy Moss. DCPS is a member of the IAPS and the Choir Schools' Association. Fees are currently £26,940 pa for day pupils and £41,700 pa for boarders in the senior school. Fees in the prep school are up to £20,550 pa for day pupils and up to £29,100 pa for boarders.

History
The school, originally "The Dean Close Memorial School", was founded in 1886 (79th of the 103 Victorian public schools in order of foundation) and named after the Very Reverend Francis Close, Dean of Carlisle Cathedral. Alumni include the poet James Elroy Flecker, whose father was the School's first headmaster (the old Flecker Hall was named after him), and the artist Francis Bacon.

In the First World War more than 120 former pupils were killed; their names, along with the names of young men killed during the Second World War, are recorded in the school's memorial chapel which was consecrated in 1923.

The school buildings were requisitioned by the Home Office during the Second World War and the staff and pupils were removed to Monkton Combe School near Bath in Somerset. Ultimately, the buildings were not required by the government, and were handed back in 1940. In December of the same year, the school was hit by five bombs during air raids. Two of the bombs caused substantial damage to the Junior School and shrapnel damage can be observed on what was the Careers building, now an administrative office.

In 1967, the first girl was admitted for tutorials, and by 1969 the school had started encouraging female applicants to study full-time. Enrolment increased over the next 35 years to create a balanced co-educational environment, with almost equal numbers of boys and girls.

The school hosted the JACT Greek summer school from 1969 to 1985, under the aegis of the then headmaster Christopher Turner.

The most recent additions to the school's property are a £3 million sports hall and a £4.5 million prep school hall which opened in October 2013.

In June 2015, Dean Close School announced the acquisition of a preparatory school, St John's on the Hill, Chepstow.

Academic achievement
A-Level results in 2007 saw the school achieve a 100% pass rate with 81% of exams graded A–B. These results have put Dean Close in the top 100 schools in England as ranked by UCAS points per candidate. A majority of pupils attend Russell Group universities, with almost one in six achieving places at Oxbridge in recent years.

In 2010, Dean Close pupils achieved the best GCSE results in the school's history with 62% attaining A/A*, and with an overall pass rate of 98%.

As of 2014, Dean Close School is ranked 61st in co-educational senior boarding schools by A Levels, with 43% of pupils achieving A level A & A* grades. 60% of pupils at Dean Close School also achieved GCSE level A & A* grades.

Drama
There are ten drama productions every year on average, from whole school musicals to pupil-produced plays. These take place in either the Bacon Theatre (a 550-seat theatre) or in the drama studio. In recent years the whole school musicals have included Singing in the Rain, Chicago, South Pacific, Les Misérables, Cabaret and West Side Story. The school has visited the Edinburgh Fringe Festival with their own theatre company, Close Up Theatre, every year since 2004, achieving a Sell-out award on every occasion.

In 2013 they performed Arcadia by Tom Stoppard, and were sold-out before the first performance. Visits from notable actors to Dean Close in the last few years include: Dominic West, Nathaniel Parker, Judi Dench, Patricia Routledge, Samuel West, Nigel Havers, Jamie Parker and Julian Fellowes.

In the last five years, pupils leaving DCS have gone on to RADA, LAMDA, Central, Mountview, Rose Bruford, ALRA and AADA (USA) The school also achieves a high success rate at the Cheltenham Festival, winning many of the entered classes. They also have pupils acting semi-professionally at venues such as the Globe.

Sport
In February 2013, the U18 girls won the Schools National Hockey competition, and Silver Medallists in the final of the indoor format a month previously. In the summer of 2012 the U16 boys hockey team won the Schools National Hockey competition. In the summer of 2009, Dean Close U18 boys hockey team won the Schools National Hockey competition. They also reached the Schools National Hockey Finals again in 2010 and 2011. In 2012, Dean Close equestrians won the National Schools Cross-Country Champions and the National Schools' Two-Day Event.

Schola Cantorum
The Abbey School, Tewkesbury, was founded by Miles Amherst in 1973 as the choir school for Tewkesbury Abbey. When the school closed in 2006, its choir (The Choir of the Abbey School, Tewkesbury) was renamed Tewkesbury Abbey Schola Cantorum at Dean Close and given a home at Dean Close Prep School. The choir of men and children sings traditional choral evensong in the abbey on weekdays during term time, and special services on other occasions.

The choir has an extensive catalogue of recordings on the Delphian, Guild, Naxos, Priory, Regent, Hyperion and Signum labels. It has performed widely in the UK and around the world, including with the BBC National Orchestra, and broadcasts choral evensong on BBC Radio 3.

The choir is widely travelled, including tours of the US, France, Germany, Italy and Sweden. Gabriel Jackson, Mark Blatchly, John Caldwell and Grayston Ives have all written for the choir, which, in 2007, also gave the first performance of Bob Chilcott's The Night He Was Born.

Houses (Senior)
 Brook Court — Boys' boarding (opened by Prince Edward, Earl of Wessex)
 Dale — Boys' day
 Fawley — Girls' boarding
 Field — Boys' day
 Gate — Boys' boarding (6th Form)
 Hatherley — Girls' day 
 Mead — Girls' day
 Shelburne — Girls' boarding
 Tower — Boys' boarding (renovation opened by Bear Grylls in 2005)
 Turner — Girls' boarding (6th Form)

Houses (Prep school)
 Caledecote — Boarding boys (Year 6-8)
 Fortfield — Boarding girls (Year 6-8)
 Wilton — Boarding Junior (Boys & Girls) (Year 3-5)
 Oaksey — Day
 Deacon — Day
 Yeaman — Day

Notable Old Decanians

Former pupils of the school are known as 'Old Decanians', decanus being the Latin for dean.
 George Adamson (1906–1989), environmentalist.
 Oliver Claude Allison (1908–1989), Bishop of the Sudan 1955–1974.
 Francis Bacon (1909–1992), artist and painter of Three Studies of Lucian Freud.
 Richard St. Barbe Baker (1889–1982), environmentalist, forester and writer.
 Francis Berry (1915–2006), poet and critic.
 David Fieldhouse (1925-2018), historian of imperial economics
 Timothy Bliss (born 1940), neuroscientist and a winner of Grete Lundbeck European Brain Research Prize.
 Peter Browne (born 1987), professional rugby union player for Harlequins
 Denis Burkitt (1911–1993), surgeon.
 Ernest Cossart (1876–1951), actor (and brother of composer Gustav Holst).
 Basil Dale (1903–1932), Anglican Bishop of Jamaica 1950–1955.
 William Dimoline (1897–1964), British general.
 Verrier Elwin (1902–1964), missionary.
 James Flecker (1884–1915), English poet, novelist and playwright.
 Robert Evans (born 1943), Regius Professor of Modern History at the University of Oxford.
 Andrew Goudie (born 1945), geographer and Master of St Cross College, Oxford.
 Stanley Hoare (1903–1994), house master of Brook, hockey player for England, cricketer for Gloucestershire.
 Tom Johnson (born 1982), professional rugby union player for Exeter Chiefs and England
 Brian Jones (1942–1969), musician, guitarist and founding member of the Rolling Stones.
 G. Wilson Knight (1897–1985), literary critic and academic.
 Sir John Leonard (1926–2002), judge
 Gordon Luce (1889–1979), scholar and member of the Cambridge Apostles.
 Samer Majali, businessman and former CEO of Gulf Air.
 Ben Marsden (born 1979), hockey player for England.
 Mpumelelo Mbangwa (born 1976), cricketer and commentator.
 Will Merrick (born 1993), actor
 John Metcalf (born 1946), composer.
 Robert Moreland (born 1941), consultant, politician and a former Conservative Party Member of the European Parliament
 Stephen Neill (1900–1984), Anglican missionary, Bishop of Tirunelveli 1939 & scholar
 Geoffrey Page (1920–2000), Second World War fighter pilot.
 Hugh Quarshie (born 1954), actor.
 Bernard Ribeiro, Baron Ribeiro (born 20 January 1944), former president of the Royal College of Surgeons.
 John Simpson (born 1953), Chief Editor, Oxford English Dictionary
 Emma Sky (born 1968), Middle East expert and political advisor to U.S. General Ray Odierno.
 Wilfrid St Clair Tisdall (1921-2014), Military Cross recipient
 Jonty Strachan (born 1987), cricketer
 Jim Thompson (1936–2003), Bishop of Bath and Wells 1991 – 2001.
 Jeremy Wade (born 1956), television presenter
 William Welch (1906–1999), Bishop of Bradwell 1968–1973.

References

External links
 Official website
 Old Decanians website

Choir schools in England
Educational institutions established in 1886
Schools in Cheltenham
Private schools in Gloucestershire
Member schools of the Headmasters' and Headmistresses' Conference
Boarding schools in Gloucestershire

1886 establishments in England